Superbeautifulmonster is the fourth studio album by Canadian singer Bif Naked, released in 2005. The album's lead single, "Let Down", was a moderate hit in Canada, peaking at No. 20 on Canada's Rock chart.

Track listing
"Abandonment" (Bif Naked, Jimmy Allen, Peter Karroll) – 3:12
"Let Down"* (Kevin Kadish) – 2:44
"Everyday" (Naked, Kadish) – 3:25
"Yeah, You" (Naked, Allen) – 3:43
"That's Life" (Naked, John Dexter, Karroll) – 2:45
"Nothing Else Matters" (James Hetfield, Lars Ulrich) – 4:41
"I Want" (Naked, Karroll, Doug Fury) – 2:23
"Funeral of a Good Grrl" (Naked, Kadish) – 2:36
"Henry" (Naked, Karroll) – 3:54
"The World Is Over" (Naked, Karroll) – 2:47
"The Question Song" (Naked, Karroll, Fury) – 4:17
"Ladybug Waltz" (Naked, Karroll, Fury) – 3:59
"After a While" (Naked, Karroll, Fury) – 4:51

Credits
 Bif Naked - vocals, background vocals
 Todd Kerns - guitar, bass, background vocals
 Doug Fury - guitar, bass, programming
 Scotty Sexx - Live Drums
 John Webster - keyboards/strings, programming
 Mike Norman - programming
 Kevin Kadish - guitar, programming
 Jack Daley - bass, Minimoog
 Dave Baron - keyboards
 Denny Weston Jr. - drums
 Aaron Gainer - studio drums 
 Dave Fortman - bass
 Kevin Dorr - bass
 David Hodges - drums

Production
 Producer: Peter Karroll, Kevin Kadish, Dave Fortman
 Mixing: Paul Silveira
 Engineers: Paul Silveira, Aaron Nordean, Rob Stefanson, Kevin Kadish, Jeremy Parker, Wes Fontenot

References

2005 albums
Bif Naked albums